The Broadmoor Golf Club is a pair of golf courses, located on the grounds of The Broadmoor, a historic hotel and resort Colorado Springs, Colorado. Originally opened in 1918 and designed by Donald Ross, the course format was expanded in 1965 with 18 additional holes designed by Robert Trent Jones.

The club has hosted several USGA championships since 1959, including the 1995 and 2011 U.S. Women's Open, the 2008 and 2018 U.S. Senior Open, and the 1959 and 1967 U.S. Amateur.

The current layout consists of the East Course and the West Course, and the club previously had a third 18-hole course, the Mountain Course, which was closed after a 2016 rockslide.

History
The original course opened  in 1918 and has hosted several USGA championships since 1959, most recently the U.S. Senior Open in 2018, won by David Toms.

The East Course previously hosted the U.S. Women's Open in 1995, the first of the ten majors won by Annika Sörenstam.

The current course format (East and West) opened in 1965, featuring new routing and 18 additional holes designed by Robert Trent Jones. The West Course includes the front 9 holes from the original Ross course (now holes 1–4, 13–18 on West). The East Course includes the original back 9 Donald Ross holes (now holes 1–6,16-18 on East). The Mountain Course opened in 1976 and was designed by Arnold Palmer and Ed Seay. It was renovated by Jack Nicklaus' company in 2006 and closed in 2016 due to a landslide. Nicklaus won his first major tournament, the 1959 U.S. Amateur, at the East Course at the age of 19.

See also
The Broadmoor

References

External links
 

 2018 U.S. Senior Open – official site 
 2008 U.S. Senior Open – official site (archived) 

Golf clubs and courses in Colorado
Golf clubs and courses designed by Robert Trent Jones
Golf clubs and courses designed by Jack Nicklaus
Golf clubs and courses designed by Donald Ross
Curtis Cup venues
Buildings and structures in Colorado Springs, Colorado
Tourism in Colorado Springs, Colorado